Cham Kabud Rural District is a rural district (dehestan) in Sarab Bagh District, Abdanan County, Ilam Province, Iran. At the 2006 census, its population was 5,424, in 1,108 families.  The rural district has 8 villages.

References 

Rural Districts of Ilam Province
Abdanan County